Muhammad Muzammil Qureshi (born 9 February 1979) is a Pakistani politician who had been a member of the National Assembly of Pakistan, from June 2013 to May 2018. Previously he had been a member of the Provincial Assembly of Sindh from 2008 to 2013.

Early life and education
He was born on 9 February 1979 in Karachi.

He has done Master of Arts in Political Science from the Federal Urdu University and Bachelor of Arts from the University of Karachi.

Political career

He was elected to the Provincial Assembly of Sindh as a candidate of Muttahida Qaumi Movement (MQM) from Constituency PS-118 (Karachi-XXX) in 2008 Pakistani general election. He received 44,811 votes and defeated Qazi Iftikhar Ahmed Qureshi, a candidate of Pakistan Peoples Party (PPP).

He was elected to the National Assembly of Pakistan as a candidate of MQM from Constituency NA-253 (Karachi-XV) in 2013 Pakistani general election. He received 101,386 votes and defeated Muhammad Ashraf Jabbar Qureshi, a candidate of Pakistan Tehreek-e-Insaf (PTI).

In April 2018, he quit MQM and joined Pak Sarzameen Party.

References

Living people
Pakistani MNAs 2013–2018
Politicians from Karachi
Muttahida Qaumi Movement MNAs
1979 births
Sindh MPAs 2008–2013
University of Karachi alumni